The Cornell University Press is the university press of Cornell University; currently housed in Sage House, the former residence of Henry William Sage. It was first established in 1869, making it the first university publishing enterprise in the United States, but was inactive from 1884 to 1930.

The press was established in the College of the Mechanic Arts (as mechanical engineering was called in the 19th century) because engineers knew more about running steam-powered printing presses than literature professors. Since its inception, The press has offered work-study financial aid: students with previous training in the printing trades were paid for typesetting and running the presses that printed textbooks, pamphlets, a weekly student journal, and official university publications.

Today, the press is one of the country's largest university presses. It produces approximately 150 nonfiction titles each year in various disciplines, including anthropology, Asian studies, biological sciences, classics, history, industrial relations, literary criticism and theory, natural history, philosophy, politics and international relations, veterinary science, and women's studies. Although the press has been subsidized by the university for most of its history, it is now largely dependent on book sales to finance its operations.

In 2010, the Mellon Foundation, whose President Don Michael Randel is a former Cornell Provost, awarded to the press a $50,000 grant to explore new business models for publishing scholarly works in low-demand humanities subject areas. With this grant, a book series was published titled "Signale: Modern German Letters, Cultures, and Thoughts". Only 500 hard copies of each book in the series will be printed, with extra copies manufactured on demand once the original supply is depleted.

Other currently active series include "Expertise: Cultures and Technologies of Knowledge" and Police/Worlds: Studies in security, crime and governance.

Domestic distribution for the press is currently provided by the University of North Carolina Press's Longleaf Services.

Notable books

See also

 List of English-language book publishing companies
 List of university presses

References

External links

Press
Publishing companies established in 1869
Book publishing companies based in New York (state)
University presses of the United States
1869 establishments in New York (state)